Alfonso Beorlegui y Canet (26 January 1888 – 29 September 1936) was a colonel of infantry in the Spanish Army. In the Spanish Civil War, he led the Nationalist forces in the Campaign of Gipuzkoa in August and September 1936.

On 18 July 1936, at the beginning of the Spanish Civil War, in Pamplona, Beorlegui put himself under the orders of General Emilio Mola, who ordered him take control of the Civil Guard and Assault Guards of the city—approximately 2,000 men—and put him in charge of public order in the city. Shortly afterward, Mola ordered Beorlegui to lead an offensive to the Basque province of Gipuzkoa with the regular troops, Civil Guard forces and some newly raised units of requetés.

After the Battle of Irún, they occupied the town on 5 September, closing the French border to the northern provinces of the republic. Beorlegui was wounded in the advance towards the international bridge of Irún, refused to receive suitable treatment, and died a month later. Mola's forces soon went on to secure the whole of the province, isolating the remaining Republican provinces in the north, which led to their fall the next year.

Bibliography

External links 
 "Beorlegui y Canet, Alfonso"  – Auñamendi Eusko Entziklopedia

1888 births
1936 deaths
Military personnel killed in the Spanish Civil War
People from Estella Oriental
Spanish casualties of the Spanish Civil War
Spanish military personnel killed in action
Spanish military personnel of the Spanish Civil War (National faction)
Spanish army officers
20th-century Spanish military personnel